The Asia/Oceania Zone is one of the three zones of regional Davis Cup competition in 2014.

In the Asia/Oceania Zone there are four different groups in which teams compete against each other to advance to the next group.

Participating nations

Seeds:

Remaining nations:

Draw

 and  relegated to Group III in 2015.
 promoted to Group I in 2015.

First round

Sri Lanka vs. Philippines

Vietnam vs. Pakistan

Thailand vs. Hong Kong

Kuwait vs. Indonesia

Second round

Philippines vs. Pakistan

Thailand vs. Kuwait

Play-off

Vietnam vs. Sri Lanka

Hong Kong vs. Indonesia

Third round

Thailand vs. Pakistan

References

External links
Official Website

Asia Oceania Zone II
Davis Cup Asia/Oceania Zone